The 3 arrondissements of the Vendée department are:
 Arrondissement of Fontenay-le-Comte, (subprefecture: Fontenay-le-Comte) with 110 communes. The population of the arrondissement was 141,620 in 2016.  
 Arrondissement of La Roche-sur-Yon, (prefecture of the Vendée department: La Roche-sur-Yon) with 77 communes. The population of the arrondissement was 293,895 in 2016.  
 Arrondissement of Les Sables-d'Olonne, (subprefecture: Les Sables-d'Olonne) with 71 communes. The population of the arrondissement was 235,082 in 2016.

History

In 1800 the arrondissements of Fontenay-le-Comte, Montaigu and Les Sables-d'Olonne were established. La Roche-sur-Yon replaced Fontenay-le-Comte as prefecture in 1804. Fontenay-le-Comte replaced Montaigu as subprefecture in 1811. 

The borders of the arrondissements of Vendée were modified in January 2017:
 11 communes from the arrondissement of La Roche-sur-Yon to the arrondissement of Fontenay-le-Comte
 eight communes from the arrondissement of Les Sables-d'Olonne to the arrondissement of La Roche-sur-Yon

In January 2019 the commune Landeronde passed from the arrondissement of Les Sables-d'Olonne to the arrondissement of La Roche-sur-Yon.

References

Vendee